The 1948 United States presidential election in Wisconsin was held on November 2, 1948 as part of the 1948 United States presidential election. State voters chose 12 electors to the Electoral College, who voted for president and vice president.

Background
Politics in Wisconsin since the Populist movement had been dominated by the Republican Party. The Democratic Party became uncompetitive outside certain eastern German areas as the upper classes, along with the majority of workers who followed them, fled from William Jennings Bryan’s agrarian and free silver sympathies. Although the state did develop a strong Socialist Party to provide opposition to the GOP, Wisconsin developed the direct Republican primary in 1903 and this ultimately created competition between the “League” under Robert M. La Follette, and the conservative “Regular” faction. This ultimately would develop into the Wisconsin Progressive Party in the late 1930s, which was opposed to the conservative German Democrats and to the national Republican Party, and allied with Franklin D. Roosevelt at the federal level.

During the two wartime elections, the formerly Democratic German counties in the east of the state – which had been powerfully opposed to the Civil War because they saw it as a “Yankee” war and opposed the military draft instituted during it – viewed Communism as a much greater threat to America than Nazism and consequently opposed President Roosevelt’s war effort. Consequently, these historically Democratic counties became virtually the most Republican in the entire state, and the two wartime elections were very close after Roosevelt had in 1932 and 1936, aided by the support of Robert M. La Follette Jr., carried the Badger State by more than two-to-one.

As the Progressive Party disintegrated and its members returned to the GOP, that party regained its hegemony in the state legislature and Congressional representation, so that by 1946 Wisconsin had an entirely Republican Congressional delegation for the first time since the 71st Congress, and the Democrats’ representation in the state legislature fell as low as it had been since that same point.

Vote
Although the state’s Republican presidential primary went to Harold E. Stassen of neighboring Minnesota, the earliest polls had second-time nominee Thomas E. Dewey well ahead of incumbent Harry S. Truman. A final poll on the first day of November had Dewey leading by 56 percent to 41 percent, with “People’s Progressive” nominee and former Vice-President Henry A. Wallace on three percent.

Nonetheless, as he achieved elsewhere in the Midwest, Truman made a major comeback to claim Wisconsin by a larger margin than Roosevelt had done in 1940. His victory was attributed to the fact that Dewey, compared to 1944, soft-pedalled the issue of communism, to the fact that a large number of isolationist voters who had been responsible for the dramatic Republican presidential gains earlier in the decade stayed home, and to fear of loss of New Deal farm programs if Dewey were elected. Henry Wallace’s candidacy, of which much had been expected due to the state’s isolationism, disappointed, receiving only 1.98 percent of the vote mostly from historically progressive Scandinavian-Americans, further helping Truman.

Results

Results by county

See also
 United States presidential elections in Wisconsin

References

Wisconsin
1948
1948 Wisconsin elections